This list covers television programs whose first letter (excluding "the") of the title are U, V, and W.

U

UF
UFC Tonight
UFC Ultimate Insider

UG
Ugly Americans
Ugly Betty

UH 

 Uh Oh!

UL

 Ultimate Blackjack Tour
 Ultimate Book of Spells
Ultimate Cake Off
The Ultimate Coyote Ugly Search
The Ultimate Fighter
Ultimate Force
The Ultimate Merger
Ultimate Recipe Showdown
Ultimate Spider-Man
Ultimate Tag
Ulysses 31
Ultraman
Ultraman Orb
Ultra Violet & Black Scorpion

UM
The Umbrella Academy

UN
Unbelievable
Unbreakable Kimmy Schmidt
Uncle Grandpa
Uncle Max
Uncommon Sense with Charlamagne
Undateable
The Undateables (UK)
Undeclared
Underbelly
Undercover Boss
Undercover Boss (Canada)
Undercover Boss (UK)
Undercover Boss (US)
Undercover Boss Australia
Undercover Boss Israel
Undercover Boss Norge
Underdog
Undergrads
Underground
Under the Dome
Under the Gunn
Unfabulous
Unfiltered with Renee Young
Unhappily Ever After
Unikitty!
The Unit
United States of Tara
Unleashed
Unnatural History
Unreal
Unsolved (Scotland)
Unsolved (US)
Unsolved: The Boy Who Disappeared (UK)
Unsolved Mysteries
Untalkative Bunny
Until Tomorrow
Untold
Untold Stories of the E.R.
Untying the Knot

UP
Upload
Upper Middle Bogan
The Upside Down Show
Upstairs, Downstairs (1971)
Upstairs, Downstairs (2010)
U to U

UR
Urawa no Usagi-chan
The URL with Phred Show

US
Usavich

UT
 Utopia (British TV series), a 2013 British drama series
 Utopia (Australian TV series), a 2014– Australian comedy series
 Utopia (Dutch reality TV series), a 2014– Dutch reality series
 Utopia (2014 American TV series), a 2014 American reality series based on the Dutch series
 Ütopya, a 2014–15 Turkish reality series based on the Dutch series
 Utopia (2020 TV series), an upcoming American adaption of the 2013 British drama series of the same name

V

V
V (1983 miniseries)
V (1984 miniseries)
V (1984)
V (2009)

VA
The Vacant Lot
The Valleys (UK)
The Vampire Diaries
Vampire High
Vampirina
Vanderpump Rules
Vanderpump Rules After Show
Vanderpump Rules: Jax And Brittany Take Kentucky
Van Der Valk
Van Helsing
Variety Studio: Actors on Actors

VE
Veep
 Vegas (1978)
Vegas (2012)
VeggieTales
The Venture Bros.
Vera
The Verdict (BBC)
Veronica Mars
Veronica's Closet
Very Cavallari

VH
VH1's Legends

VI
Vic the Viking
Vicar of Dibley
Victoria (Columbia) 
Victoria (UK)
Victor and Valentino
Victorious
Video Power
The View
Viewpoint
Viking: The Ultimate Obstacle Course (Japan)
Vikings (BBC)
Vikings (Canada and Ireland)
The Village
Villainous
The Villains of Valley View
Violetta (Argentina)
Viper
The Virginian
Virgin River (BBC)
The Visit (BBC)
Viva La Bam
Viva Piñata
Viva Valdez
Vixen

VO
The Voice
The Voice (US)
Voltron
Voltron: Defender of the Universe 
Voltron: Legendary Defender
Voyage to the Bottom of the Sea

VR
VR.5

W

WA
Wabbit
Wacky Races
Waco
Wagon Train
WAGS
WAGS Atlanta
WAGS Miami
WAG Nation (Australia)
Wahlburgers
Wait Till Your Father Gets Home
Walker, Texas Ranger
Walk the Prank
The Wall (UK)
The Wall (U.S. game show)
Wall of Fame (UK game show)
The Wallace and Ladmo Show
Wallykazam!
The Walking Dead
The Walter Winchell Show
The Waltons
WandaVision
Wanda at Large
Wander Over Yonder
Wanna Play?
Wanted: Dead or Alive
The War at Home
Warehouse 13
War of the Worlds
War Planets
Warped!
Warsaw Shore (Poland)
Warship
Washington Week
Watchdog (UK)
Watching Ellie
Watch Mr. Wizard
Watch What Happens Live with Andy Cohen
Waterloo Road
Watership DownThe Way of the MasterThe Wayans Bros.WayneheadWaysideWCWCW Monday NitroWCW Saturday NightWCW ThunderWEWe Are the Champions (UK)We Have IssuesThe Weakest Link (Australia)The Weakest Link (UK)Weakest Link (US)WeaponologyThe WebThe WebWebsterWednesday Night BaseballWee 3 (Canada)WeedsThe WeekendersWeekend LiveWeinervilleWeird ScienceWeird or What?Welcome Back, KotterWelcome FreshmenWelcome to Myrtle ManorWelcome to the NeighborhoodWelcome to Pooh CornerWelcome to Sweetie Pie'sWelcome to the WayneWendell & VinnieThe Wendy Williams ShowWest 57thWest Coast Wrestling ConnectionWest Point StoryThe West WingWestworldWe Bare BearsWHWhammy! The All-New Press Your LuckWhat About BrianWhat About Mimi?What a Cartoon!Whatever Happened to Robot Jones?What Happens at The AbbeyWhat If...What If?What I Like About YouWhat Not to Wear (UK)What Not to Wear (US)What We Do in the ShadowsWhat Would Ryan Lochte Do?What Would You Do? (1991 game show)What Would You Do? (2008)What's Alan Watching?What's Happening!!What's My Line?What's New, Scooby-Doo?What the Papers SayWhat's the Story?What’s with Andy?Wheel of FortuneWheel of Fortune 2000Wheel Squad (France)When the Boat Comes In (UK)When Calls the HeartWhen Games AttackWhen They See UsWhen Things Were RottenWhen We RiseWhere Are They Now? (Australia)Where Are They Now? (Hong Kong)Where Are They Now? (US)Where the Heart IsWhere in the World Is Carmen Sandiego?Where's Chicky?Where's Wally?While You Were OutWhiplashWhirlybirdsWhiskey CavalierWhistleblowerWhistlerWhite CollarThe White PrincessThe White Queen (UK)The White ShadowThe Whitest Kids U' KnowWhitney Who Dares Wins (Australia)
 Who Dares Wins (UK)Who Is America?Who's the Boss?Who's Watching the Kids?Whose Line Is It Anyway? (UK)Whose Line Is It Anyway? (US)Who Do You Think You Are? (Australia)Who Do You Think You Are? (Canada)Who Do You Think You Are? (Ireland)Who Do You Think You Are? (UK)Who Do You Think You Are? (US)Who Wants to Be a Millionaire?Who Wants to Be a Millionaire? (Australia)Who Wants to Be a Millionaire? (UK)Who Wants to Be a Millionaire? (US)Who Wants to Be a Superhero?Who Wants to Be a Super MillionaireWho Wants to Marry a Multi-Millionaire?Who Wants to Marry My Dad?The Who, What, or Where GameWhy Not? with Shania TwainWIWibbly PigWicked AttractionWicked CityWicked ScienceWicked TunaWife Swap (UK)Wife Swap (US)The Wild Adventures of Blinky BillWildboyzWild CardWild & Crazy KidsWildfireWild GrindersWild KingdomWild KrattsWild On!Wild 'n OutThe Wild ThornberrysThe Wild Wild WestThe WildsWill & GraceWill and DewittWillo the Wisp (British)Will Work for FoodWillyWimzie's HouseWin Ben Stein's MoneyWindow on Main StreetWingin' ItWings (US)Wings (UK)Win, Lose or DrawWinner Take AllWinning StreakWinsanityWinter Break: Hunter MountainWinTuitionWinx ClubWipeout (1988)Wipeout (2008)The WireWire in the BloodWisdom of the CrowdWiseguyWishfartWish KidW.I.T.C.H.WitchbladeWitches of East EndWith This RingWithout a TraceWithout Prejudice?WITS AcademyWizardsWizards and WarriorsWizards of Waverly PlaceThe WizardThe Wizard of OzWKWKRP in CincinnatiWOWok with YanWolverineWolverine and the X-MenThe Wombles (1973) (UK)The Wombles (1996) (UK)Women's Murder ClubWonderfallsWonder ShowzenThe Wonderful World of DisneyThe Wonderful World of Mickey MouseWonder WomanThe Wonder YearsThe Woodentops (UK)The WoodlandersWork OutWork Out New YorkWordGirlWordWorldMikki vs The WorldWorkaholicsWorkingWorking ClassWorking GirlWorld Class CuisineWorld of DanceWorld News NowWorld of QuestWorld of Sport (UK)World of Winx (Italy)The World According to Jeff GoldblumThe World According to ParisWorld Blackjack TourWorld Series of BlackjackWorld TriggerThe World's BestWorld's Dumbest CriminalsWorld's Funniest VideosWorld's Most Amazing VideosThe World's Strictest ParentsWorld's Wildest Police VideosWorst Bakers in AmericaWorst Cooks in AmericaWow! Wow! Wubbzy!WRWrestling Society XThe Wrong Mans WU 

 The WuzzlesWWWWE 24WWE 205 LiveWWE AfterburnWWE BackstageWWE Bottom LineWWE Breaking GroundWWE Bring It to the TableWWE Diva SearchWWE ECWWWE ExperienceWWE Free for AllWWE HeatWWE Legends' HouseWWE Main EventWWE Mixed Match ChallengeWWE NXTWWE NXT Level UpWWE RawWWE Raw TalkWWE Ride AlongWWE Saturday Morning SlamWWE Slam CityWWE SmackDownWWE Superstar InkWWE SuperstarsWWE Talking SmackWWE Tough EnoughWWE Tribute to the TroopsWWE VelocityWWE VintageWWE Wal3ooha (Middle East)WWE Worlds CollideWWE's Most Wanted TreasuresWWF Jakked/MetalWWF The Main EventWWF Prime Time WrestlingWWF Shotgun Saturday NightWWF Superstars of Wrestling''

Previous:  List of television programs: T    Next:  List of television programs: X-Y-Z